Henry of Isenburg-Neumagen (German: Heinrich von Isenburg-Neumagen) was the Count of Isenburg-Neumagen from 1534 until 1554.

House of Isenburg